George Jost Hauptfuhrer, Jr. (August 1, 1926 – August 2, 2013) was an American basketball player who, despite being taken third overall in the 1948 BAA Draft after a collegiate career at Louisville and Harvard, decided to pursue a career in law.

Hauptfuhrer grew up in Philadelphia, Pennsylvania, and attended William Penn Charter School. He then enrolled at Louisville where he played center on the basketball team for two seasons; while attending he was in a Navy training program. Hauptfuhrer transferred to Harvard for his final two years of college; while there, he played on the football, basketball, and track and field teams. He was named an all-Ivy League selection in basketball during his senior year in 1947–48.

In just the second-ever Basketball Association of America draft, Hauptfuhrer was selected third overall by the Boston Celtics. Instead of pursuing a professional basketball career, he decided to enroll at the University of Pennsylvania Law School and became a lawyer.

References

External links
Hauptfuhrer, Fuller Named '48 Captains. The Crimson. March 19, 1947. Retrieved on February 5, 2013.
Paid Hands (and Feet). The College Pump. September 2007. Retrieved on February 5, 2013.
1997 Athletic Honor Society Inductees. Penn Charter School. Retrieved on February 5, 2013.

1926 births
2013 deaths
American men's basketball players
Basketball players from Philadelphia
Boston Celtics draft picks
Centers (basketball)
Harvard Crimson football players
Harvard Crimson men's basketball players
Harvard Crimson men's track and field athletes
Louisville Cardinals baseball players
Louisville Cardinals men's basketball players
Pennsylvania lawyers
Players of American football from Pennsylvania
University of Pennsylvania Law School alumni
William Penn Charter School alumni
20th-century American lawyers
United States Navy personnel of World War II